Willie Wright (born February 25, 1996) is an American football offensive tackle for the San Antonio Brahmas of the XFL. He played college football for the Tulsa Golden Hurricane.

Personal life and high school
Willie Wright was born on February 25, 1996, and is a Houston, Texas native. Wright attended the local Cypress Ridge High School. During his high school career, he earned first-team all-district as a senior offensive tackle in 2013.

College career
After finishing high school, Wright then attended the University of Tulsa. Wright played college football at Tulsa from 2014 to 2018. Wright was a consistent starter at Tulsa, starting 47 out of the 48 games he played in. In 2017, with his help on the offensive line, he helped Tulsa's running game reach the ranking of 14th nationally with 247.2 yards per game.

Professional career

Cleveland Browns
After not being drafted in the 2019 NFL Draft, Wright was signed by the Cleveland Browns. He spent the entirety of the 2019 NFL season on their practice squad. After the 2019 season, the Browns opted to not retain Wright for another season.

Atlanta Falcons
Before the 2020 NFL season, the Falcons signed Wright to the Falcons roster. Despite not making the final roster, Wright did make the practice squad. He was elevated to the active roster on December 12 for the team's week 14 game against the Los Angeles Chargers, and reverted to the practice squad after the game. He signed a reserve/future contract on January 4, 2021. He was waived on August 24, 2021.

Chicago Bears
On February 11, 2022, the Chicago Bears signed Wright to a reserves/futures deal. He was waived on July 26, 2022.

Tennessee Titans
On August 3, 2022, Wright signed with the Tennessee Titans. He was waived on August 30.

Las Vegas Raiders
On December 13, 2022, Wright was signed to the Las Vegas Raiders practice squad. He was released from the practice squad fifteen days later.

San Antonio Brahmas
Wright was placed on the reserve list by the San Antonio Brahmas of the XFL on February 20, 2023.

References

External links
 Tulsa Golden Hurricane bio

1996 births
Living people
American football offensive linemen
Tulsa Golden Hurricane football players
Cleveland Browns players
Atlanta Falcons players
Carolina Panthers players
Chicago Bears players
Tennessee Titans players
Las Vegas Raiders players
San Antonio Brahmas players